The climate movement is a global social movement focused on pressuring governments and industry to take action (also called "climate action") addressing the causes and impacts of climate change. Environmental non-profit organizations have engaged in significant climate activism since the late 1980s and early 1990s, as they sought to influence the United Nations Framework Convention on Climate Change (UNFCCC). Climate activism has become increasingly prominent over time, gaining significant momentum during the 2009 Copenhagen Summit and particularly following the signing of the Paris Agreement in 2016.

Environmental organizations take various actions such as Peoples Climate Marches. A major event was the global climate strike in September 2019 organized by Fridays For Future and Earth Strike. The target was to influence the climate action summit organized by the UN on 23 September. According to the organizers four million people participated in the strike on 20 September.  Youth activism and involvement has played an important part in the evolution of the movement after the growth of the Fridays For Future strikes started by Greta Thunberg in 2019. In 2019, Extinction Rebellion organized large protests demanding to "reduce carbon emissions to zero by 2025, and create a citizens' assembly to oversee progress", including blocking roads.

History
Activism related to climate change began in the late 1980s, when major environmental organizations became involved in the discussions about climate, mainly in the UNFCCC framework. Whereas environmental organizations had previously primarily been engaged at the domestic level, they began to increasingly engage in international campaigning. The largest transnational climate change coalition, Climate Action Network, was founded in 1992. Its major members include Greenpeace, WWF, Oxfam and Friends of the Earth. Climate Justice Now! and Climate Justice Action, two major coalitions, were founded in the lead-up to the 2009 Copenhagen Summit.

Mobilization for Copenhagen 2009
The 2009 United Nations Climate Change Conference in Copenhagen was the first UNFCCC summit in which the climate movement started showing its mobilization power at a large scale. According to Jennifer Hadden, the number of new NGOs registered with the UNFCCC surged in 2009 in the lead-up to the Copenhagen summit. Between 40,000 and 100,000 people attended a march in Copenhagen on December 12 calling for a global agreement on climate. Activism went beyond Copenhagen, with more than 5,400 rallies and demonstrations took place around the world simultaneously.

Methods 

These are several approaches that have been used in the past by climate advocates and advocacy campaigns:

 the provision of information,
 framing of information about aspects of global climate change, and
 challenging the terms of political debates.

All three of these methods have been implemented in climate campaigns aimed at the general public. The information about the impacts of global climate change plays a role in forming climatic beliefs, attitudes, and behavior, while the effects of other approaches (e.g. provision of information about solutions to GCC, consensus framing, use of mechanistic information) is yet mostly unknown. The third approach is to create space for discussions that move beyond questions of economic interests that often dominate political debates to emphasize ecological values and grass-roots democracy. This has been argued to be crucial to bringing about more significant structural change. Some politicians, such as Arnold Schwarzenegger with the slogan "terminate pollution", say that activists should generate optimism by focusing on the health co-benefits of climate action.

Climate disobedience 

Climate disobedience is a form of civil disobedience, deliberate action intended to critique government climate policy. In 2008, American climate activist Tim DeChristopher posed as a bidder at an auction of US Bureau of Land Management oil and gas leases of public land in Utah, won the auction, reneged on payment, and was imprisoned for 21 months. In September 2015, five climate activists known as the Delta 5 obstructed an oil train in Everett, Washington. At trial, the Delta 5 were allowed the necessity defense, that is, breaking a law in the service of preventing a greater harm. After testimony, the judge determined the grounds for the necessity defense were not met and instructed the jury to disregard testimony admitted under the necessity defense. The Delta 5 were fined for trespassing but were acquitted of more serious charges.

The first example of a judge accepting the climate necessity defense was on March 27, 2018 when Judge Mary Ann Driscoll acquitted all 13 defendants of civil charges from a protest held in 2016 in Boston, Massachusetts.

Declaring emergency state 

Enacting a state of emergency may be composed of two elements: declaring a state of emergency that has formulated real-world i.e. legal effects and the associated enabling or ensuring of rapid complementary large-scale changes in human activity for the articulated purposes. To date, many governments have acknowledged, sometimes in the form of tentative text-form "declarations", that humanity is essentially in a state of climate emergency.

In November 2021 Greta Thunberg with other climate activists begun filing a petition to the United Nation calling it to declare a level 3 global climate emergency. This should lead to the creation of a special team that will coordinate the response to the climate crisis in the international level. The response should be at least as strong as the response to the COVID-19 pandemic.

It has been proposed that the national security sector could play a unique role in the development of a global climate-emergency mobilisation of labour and resources to build a zero-emission economy and enact decarbonization.

Commentators and The Climate Mobilization have suggested mobilisation of resources on the scale of a war economy and other related exceptional or effective measures.

Focus on climate justice 

Shifting away from a focus on impacts on the natural environment, in recent years people have called on decision makers to move towards equitable mitigation strategies for all people. Climate justice acknowledges that some regions and populations are more vulnerable to climate change than others, and that in addressing climate solutions we must consider "existing vulnerabilities, resources and capabilities."

In the United States, organizations such as the Climate Justice Alliance work towards the goal of resilient economies and communities, placing "race, gender and class at the center of the solutions" by working to unite the voices of frontline communities.

Legal action 

In some countries, those affected by climate change may be able to sue major greenhouse gas emitters. Litigation has been attempted by entire countries and peoples, such as Palau and the Inuit, as well as non-governmental organizations such as the Sierra Club. Investor-owned coal, oil, and gas corporations could be legally and morally liable for climate-related human rights violations. Litigations are often carried out via collective pooling of effort and resources such as via organizations like Greenpeace, which sued a Polish coal utility and a German car manufacturer.

Proving that some weather events are due specifically to global warming is now possible, and methodologies have been developed to show the increased risk of other events caused by global warming.

For a legal action for negligence (or similar) to succeed, "Plaintiffs ... must show that, more probably than not, their individual injuries were caused by the risk factor in question, as opposed to any other cause. This has sometimes been translated to a requirement of a relative risk of at least two." Another route (though with little legal bite) is the World Heritage Convention, if it can be shown that climate change is affecting World Heritage Sites like Mount Everest.

Of countries 
Besides countries suing one another, there are also cases where people in a country have taken legal steps against their own government.

In the Netherlands and Belgium, organisations such as the foundation Urgenda and the Klimaatzaak in Belgium have also sued their governments as they believe their governments are not meeting the emission reductions they agreed to. Urgenda have already won their case against the Dutch government.

In 2021, Germany's supreme constitutional court ruled that the government's climate protection measures are insufficient to protect future generations and that the government had until the end of 2022 to improve its Climate Protection Act.

Of companies 
In May 2021, in Milieudefensie et al v Royal Dutch Shell, the district court of The Hague ordered Royal Dutch Shell to cut its global carbon emissions by 45% by the end of 2030 compared to 2019 levels.

Fossil Fuel Divestment 
The divestment movement against fossil fuels has shed a different light on conversations surrounding fossil fuel finance. Banks and investors have been increasingly questioning the viability of the fossil fuel sector in the long-term. This is because this disinvestment movement is stigmatizing fossil fuels and is raising uncertainty around continued use of fossil fuels, thus reducing the financial desirability of fossil fuel assets. Because the extraction, exploration, and mining of fossil fuels are all capital-intensive activities, uncertainty around their financial risks can reduce investment. If there is a reduction in the supply of capital or a rise in the costs of capital, fossil fuel projects will end up being uneconomical. This will make the valuation of fossil fuel companies go down making them to go out of the market.       

The main argument behind fossil fuel divestment campaigns is that earning profits from investments in activities associated with fossil fuels is unethical owing to the fact that fossil fuel emissions are the primary drivers responsible for global climate change. Fossil Fuel divestment campaigns such as the Go Fossil Free campaign by 350.org are pleading with the investors to divest by immediately freezing any new investments that they might make in any fossil fuel companies and to divest from any direct ownership and commingled funds, such as fossil fuels public equities together with corporate bonds, in the next five years. 

Fossil fuel divestment campaign have three primary aims. One of them is to pressure government across the globe to put legislation in place including carbon tax or banning any further drilling of fossil fuels. The second aim is to pressure fossil fuel companies to enact transformative change in their companies by switching to forms of energy supply that are less carbon-intensive in nature. The third aim is to ensure transparency when it comes to the carbon exposure that is caused by fossil fuel companies and also to put pressure on governments across the globe to play an active role in restricting the extraction of fossil fuels.  

Fossil fuel divestment campaigns thus seek to cut everything that would be required for the growth and survival of the fossil fuel industry. These include the social license that this industry requires to operate, the political license that the fossil fuel industry needs to grow and to survive, and the financial investments that support its existence, survival, and growth. These campaigns also seek to pressure governments to play their role in trying to limit emissions. In these campaigns, campaigners demand so see that the public institutions server their ties that they have always had with this fossil fuel industry for the main purpose of tarnishing the reputation of the fossil fuel industry and to challenge the power that the industry has. By doing these, these campaigners thus want to starve fossil fuel companies of the badly needed capital and to remove both the infrastructure and the influence that this industry has. 

Divestment campaigns have been used for a variety of social justice issues in the past. For example, divestment campaigns have been launched to end investment in South Africa during apartheid, Israel, and Sudan, and against the tobacco industry. Most recently, divestment campaigns have focused on private prisons and the fossil fuel industry. These divestment calls have received a lot of attention with varying outcomes.   

The good news for the fossil fuel divestment campaigns is that their strategy could be effective. This owes to the fact that there has been an increase in the fossil fuel divestment commitments since 2000. These divestment commitments have resulted in reductions in the flow of capital into the gas and oil sector, as experienced in 33 countries across the globe between the years 2000 and 2015. Research has found that increasing gas and oil divestment pledges in various countries has also been influenced by divestment campaigns. More stringent environmental policies have also been enacted by regimes that recognize climate change as a threat to their country. 

Fossil fuel divestment has indeed gained remarkable traction over the last few years. It has transformed from being a fringe idea to becoming a movement currently valued at around $14.5 trillion. It has over one thousand endowments, pension plans, and major investors committed. It has made many of today’s retail investors and institutional investors channeling their money towards environmentally conscious funds.

Public environmental activism 
This type of citizen activism is important to creating a path to systemic change that will benefit the environment. This change can be assisted through government involvement by way of making more environmentally-conscious policies and all-encompassing changes that will be needed to make substantial environmental change. Different strategies, actions, and systems are used by citizen environmental activists for the purpose of supporting and in some cases demanding these environmental changes. There are however, issues that this type of activism faces. Issues such as potential decline in favorability and participation in environmental movements in BRIC countries, barriers to environmental citizen involvement and mobilization, and divergence in goals between environmental movements.

Creating change 
Individual, voluntary activism is not enough to make a substantial difference in prominent climate change issues, systematic change is. Carol Booth puts forward that the harm in "bystanding to inadequate laws, policies and programs warrant greater moral concern" than individual harm by way of personal emissions and similar negative actions contributing to climate change (pg. 412). In order for emissions reduction, one of many climate change issues, to occur at a scale that has positive environmental effects government action will be needed. Overall, environmental reform is best supported and advanced by activism and movements. Frederick Buttel theorizes that the reasons for this are that environmental activism and movements fight back against countermovement groups and that they ensure responsibility in regards to environmental protection.

Government systems can both shape and constrain what public activists are able to do, particularly systems found in countries like the U.S and European Union. Constraints come from institutional aspects of the government systems that make it difficult to produce legislation and other prominent changes that fight against climate change issues. The progression of mobilization in some cases depends on activists to find ways to move past barriers found in these government systems. The general public has influence over certain outcomes. "...[L]atent civic behavior, attitudes towards society, and historical patterns of expectations for institutional performance can exert surprisingly important influence on political, and even economic outcomes(pg. 33). When looking at Californian policy, it was found that the influence of citizen activism leads to systematic choices that are favorable to the environment from influential and powerful members, like policy and community figureheads.

Systems and actions in public activism 
Different strategies, systems, and actions are utilized in public environmental activism. Certain actions may be unavailable to different types of public activists depending on economic standpoint.

Erik Wright's theories of social transformation were used to analyze environmental movements and in part the actions that these movements took in their activism that connected to Wright's "transformational strategies". This includes "interstitial strategies", which are strategies that try to alter or challenge the current system, are seen in citizens actions like buying more efficient appliances and other environmentally-friendly focused consumer actions. "Ruptural strategies" "smash the current system through confrontation". Strategies like these connect to the practice in environmental movement to hold protests and resistance demonstrations. Lastly, "symbiotic strategies" are focused on collaboration through social reformation such as promoting and reforming policy to prioritize the climate's health as opposed to profit. Other types of strategies that citizen activists take are "awareness building, alliance building, and network foundation." "Conservation behavior", the public's willingness to life more environmentally-sustainable lifestyles, has been seen to become increasingly more popular both in developed and "developing democracies." In an examination of the BRIC countries, of which they are still considered developing, it is posited that if work being done by environmentalists in these countries is seen as not enough, citizens may take it upon themselves to "turn their efforts to lifestyle adjustments as an alternative form of contribution."

The United States' "citizen suit provision" is a type of system that is accessible for the use in public environmental activism. These are used in many major U.S environmental laws, are important to environmental enforcement, and deter noncompliance from agencies at fault as well as demonstrate public interest and demand. Another environmental system is "China's environmental complaint system". This system takes in citizen's reports of violations in regards to environmental issues and is used typically for the public to voice "concerns and frustrations with environmental problems and has been successful in promoting environmental awareness and engaging the public"(pg 330). The study suggested that "the role of public participation is greatly dependent on the broader governance [system] within which it is embedded, and that channeling environmental activism into [government] can significantly influence its effectiveness"(pg 326).

Obstacles 
Public activism faces challenges due to differences in economic development as well as differences in government and law. There have been "signs of declining confidence and membership in environmental [organizations]" in the BRIC countries as well as "barriers to public involvement and social [mobilization] due to close monitoring and censorship, notably in China and Russia. Issues facing more long-term environmental discourse are feelings of unconcern and helplessness are cited as obstacles that public activist groups face in trying to promote change. In addition, mainstream environmental movements are "increasingly being challenged by environmental counter-movements"(pg 309). There are also many different goals and gaps between these types of movements, as well as barriers to producing an effective, influential message to inspire other to enact change. This prevents a solid, widespread message and specific goal from all environmental groups being produced.

Targeting of activists 
The United States government through its domestic intelligence services targeted, as "domestic terrorists," environmental activists and climate change organizations, including by investigating them, questioning them, and placing them on national "watchlists" that makes it more difficult for them to board airplanes and that could instigate local law enforcement monitoring. Unknown actors also secretly hired professional hackers to launch phishing hacking attacks against climate activists who were organizing the #ExxonKnew campaign. On September 16 2022, over fifty climate protesters were arrested and jailed in the U.K. for blocking roads, with many of them going through court hearings, and some being released on bail. Alice Reid, a spokesperson for the group Rebels in Prison Support, claims that many of these protestors are young adults with no connection to the judicial system before becoming activists.

Activities

2014 People’s Climate March

The climate movement convened its largest single event on 21 September 2014, when it mobilized 400,000 activists in New York during the People’s Climate March (plus several thousand more in other cities), organized by the People's Climate Movement, to demand climate action from the global leaders gathered for the 2014 UN Climate Summit.

Institutional Climate Activism
There have been coalitions of institutional investors that have promulgated climate activism.  These initiatives have sometimes included expansive group efforts, such as Climate Action 100+ - a coalition over 300 institutional investors (including some of the largest greenhouse emitters).  Institutional activism is not uncommon, despite the common assumption that shareholder interests would be averse to such action.  However, industry-wide efforts to mitigate climate risks is often in the interest of heavily diversified firms, as climate change can have a strong effect on the global economy.

Climate Mobilization

Since 2014, growing portions of the climate movement, especially in the United States have been organizing for an international economic response to climate change on the scale of the mobilization of the American home front during World War II, with the goal of rapidly slashing carbon emissions and transitioning to 100% clean energy faster than the free market is likely to allow. Throughout 2015 and 2016, The Climate Mobilization led grassroots campaigns in the U.S. for this scale of ambition, and in July 2016, activists succeeded in getting text adopted into the Democratic Party's national platform calling for WWII-scale climate mobilization. In August 2015, environmentalist Bill McKibben published an article in the New Republic rallying Americans to "declare war on climate change."

School strikes for climate

Youth Climate Movement 
Youth all over the world have been striking, advocating, and volunteering for climate solutions. Youth climate action groups such as SustainUS, Fridays for Future, and the Sunrise Movement have called on young people to hold leaders accountable, whether through attending conferences, striking from school and pressuring politicians to listen to scientists,  or calling for greater green jobs and consolidating voting power.

In 2020 the United Nations Secretary General launched the global Youth Advisory Group on Climate Change, selecting seven members who meet to represent the changes youth are demanding globally.

Youth involvement in pro-climate action movements has increased significantly in the 21st century, and has intensified over the past few years.  Youth climate activists have used social media platforms as a vehicle to engage and protest with the current environmental issue. After Greta Thunberg started the youth movement "Strikes for Climate" by protesting outside the Swedish Parliament in 2018, she documented her journey on Twitter, where she built a network to promote her cause and call people to action.  The youth climate movement starts shifting from the traditional way to the social media platforms and it will continue in the future. 

Younger generations are paying more attention to global events, particularly climate change. Research shows that climate change is of greater concern among younger people than older people. Over 70% of Americans aged 18 to 34 worry about global warming compared with 62% of those 35 to 54 and 56% who are 55 or older. Corner claims that across European countries, young people tend to have similar or higher levels of concern than adults and have a higher sense of risk perception. Younger generations are more likely to have learned through general education about climate change in their schooling, and to be aware of the negative effects that climate change has brought to the Earth. In addition, they also see climate change as a more serious global event that is relevant to themselves because they will be more impacted, and thus should take the lead on addressing climate change. 

When the pandemic hit, most school strikes movements around the world continued to be held, but moved more onto social media platforms (Twitter, Facebook, etc), resulting in lower participation rates. However, participation in youth climate movement on social media continued to rise. Social media provided an outlet for youth to share their concerns, generate knowledge, and be more politically active since they are not yet able to vote and face logistical limitations in face-to-face participation.

The research found that activists in their study created a sense of connection to other young people and other climate change activists. They usually post their activist identities on their social media account profile. (For example, @GretaThunberg, a young climate activist #climatechange#climatestrike #youthmovement). What they share in common is that they try to inspire others to do the same in their communities by showcasing themselves as climate activists with a strong voice. The strategy for younger activists is to situate themselves within a specific role to create a relevant identity to others and make connections with other people on the internet. Thus, regardless of which side the activists are going to support, they are utilizing their social media as a medium to communicate with others in a shared way. They are playing an important role focused on engaging a range of supporters worldwide to join in the youth climate movement.YOUNGO is the official children and youth Constituency of the UNFCCC, with members up to 35 years old. One of the main tasks of this group is to draft a Global Youth Position Statement to hand officials at the annual UNFCCC Conference of Parties.

2019 Global Climate Strike

See also 
 Business action on climate change
 Climate action
Effects of climate change
 Environmental movement
 Ecological movement
 Environmental racism
 List of environmental protests
 List of women climate scientists and activists

References

Green politics
Movement